Stemona is a genus of vines and subshrubs in the family Stemonaceae, described as a genus in 1790.

Stemona is native to China, the Indian Subcontinent, Southeast Asia, Papuasia, and northern Australia.

Species

Fossil record
2 fossil seeds of †Stemona germanica from the early Miocene, have been found in the Kristina Mine at Hrádek nad Nisou in North Bohemia, the Czech Republic. Fossil seeds of Stemona germanica have also been recorded from the nearby Hartau in Germany. Stemona fossil seeds are recorded from many European sites ranging in ages from the Maastrichtian to the Late Miocene.

Cultivation and uses
Stemona tuberosa (Chinese: 百部; pinyin: bǎi bù), is one of the 50 fundamental herbs used in traditional Chinese medicine.

References

External links
 
 Germplasm Resources Information Network: Stemona

Medicinal plants
Pandanales genera
Stemonaceae